The Cross for Military Valour  is a military decoration of France. It recognizes an individual bestowed a Mention in Dispatches earned for showing valour in presence of an enemy, in theatres of operations which are not subject to the award of the Croix de guerre des théâtres d'opérations extérieures (Cross of War for Foreign Theatres of Operations). The Cross for Military Valour is usually awarded for security or peacekeeping operations, always outside the French territory.

History
It was established in 1956 to reward soldiers, sailors, and airmen serving in Algeria who had committed acts of valour or gallantry in combat. Algeria was a department of France at the time, so it was not considered a declared war but peacekeeping operations on French soil. Therefore, the War Cross for foreign operational theatres, which had been awarded for valiant service in Indochina, was not considered appropriate. Médaille de la Valeur Militaire was created on 11 April 1956 with a four-grade system of distinctions. To put it on the same level as the Croix de guerre, the Medal was replaced by a Cross on 12 October 1956.

The Cross was used extensively to reward soldiers for valour in every French military operations since 1956, except the Gulf War and the Kosovo War, when Overseas War Crosses were awarded in place of Crosses for Military Valour :
 Aden Gulf (April 4 and 5, 2015)
Afghanistan (November, 2001 – a date to be determined)
 Algeria (from 31 October 1954 to 1962)
Antilles (from 16 April 2005 to 15 June 2005).
 Burkina Faso, Mali, Mauritania, Niger and Tchad (Operation Barkhane, from 1 October 2014 to present and MINUSMA from 1 August 2013 to present).
Cape Verde (On 13–14 June 2002)
Central African Republic (from 18 November 2006 to 7 December 2006; 2 March 2007)
Chad (1968; 28 January 2008)
Congo (service in 1960?) | Zaïre (service in 1978?) | Democratic Republic of the Congo (from 2 June to 26 September 2003)
Haiti (from 19 February 2004 to 30 June 2004)
 Iraq and Syria (Opération Chammal ; from 8 August 2014 to present)
Ivory Coast (Opération Licorne from 19 September 2002. to December 31, 2014) 
Lebanon (from 9 January 2005 to 16 July 2006)
Liberia (9–10 June 2003)
 Libya (Opération Harmattan from 22 February 2011 to present).
 Mauritania (from 10 January 1957 to November 1960)
 Morocco (from 1 January 1953 to 1956).
 Sénégal, Burkina Faso, Mauritanie, Mali and Niger (Opération Serval, from 11 January 2013).
 Tunisia (from 1 June 1953 to 1956)

Grades of distinction
The grades of the Cross are insignia of a mention in dispatches, which can be of one of five levels matching the valour displayed by the recipient while in presence of an enemy. They are each named after a historical formation of the French military.

Eligibility and awarding process
The 1956 Cross was meant principally for soldiers, but a provision was made for civilians participating in a peacekeeping operation. On 2 December 2005 this provision was amended in order to reward only civilian employees of the Ministry of Defence on official missions overseas. Originally, the cross was not awarded to members of foreign militaries or governments. This restriction was lifted on 9 November 2011 for acts of valour or performed valiant service while on joint operations with French forces. Collective awards can be made to military units, both French and foreign, since 2011. When a unit has decorated twice with the Cross at its highest level, the fourragère can be worn on uniforms.

The four first grades of the Cross can be awarded by Chef d'état-major des Armées (Chairman of the Joint Chiefs of Staff), but the Cross with Palm decoration is only awarded by the Ministre de la Défense (Minister of Defence).

Award description
Medal: suspended from a ribbon is a 36 mm bronze cross, with an effigy of the Republic crowned with a wreath, with the edge embossed: "REPUBLIQUE  FRANCAISE". On the reverse is the inscription: "Croix de la Valeur militaire".

Ribbon: a red bar with three vertical white bands: a centered 7 mm band, with a smaller 2 mm band on each end.

Recipient units (partial list)
Frigate Jean de Vienne (D643)
Police Mobile Armoured Group (GBGM)
17th Parachute Engineer Regiment
126th Infantry Regiment
1st Parachute Chasseur Regiment
1st Marine Infantry Parachute Regiment
3rd Combat helicopter regiment
152nd Infantry Regiment
2nd Foreign Legion Parachute Regiment
12th Cuirassier Regiment
35th Parachute Artillery Regiment
2nd Marine Infantry Regiment
3rd Marine Infantry Parachute Regiment
4th Special Forces Helicopter Regiment
13th Parachute Dragoon Regiment
2nd Foreign Legion Engineer Regiment
Escadron de Chasse 01-007 "Provence"
2/4 La Fayette Fighter Squadron
Frigate Courbet (F 712)
40th Artillery Regiment
1st Parachute Hussar Regiment
1st Foreign Legion Cavalry Regiment
2/61 Franche-Comté Transport Squadron
6th Engineers Regiment
2nd Foreign Legion Infantry Regiment
National Gendarmerie Intervention Group

See also

References

External links
 Site traitant des décorations militaires et civiles françaises
 Les décorations françaises (Ordres et médailles)

Military awards and decorations of France
Awards established in 1956
1956 establishments in France